George was a nobleman in the Kingdom of Hungary, the first known Judge royal, who held the position around between 1127 and 1131, during the reign of Stephen II of Hungary. The dignity developed from some jurisdictional roles of the Palatine of Hungary (management the royal household, representing the King at the Court of Personal Presence etc.).

References

Sources
  Markó, László: A magyar állam főméltóságai Szent Istvántól napjainkig – Életrajzi Lexikon (The High Officers of the Hungarian State from Saint Stephen to the Present Days – A Biographical Encyclopedia) (2nd edition); Helikon Kiadó Kft., 2006, Budapest; .
  Zsoldos, Attila (2011). Magyarország világi archontológiája, 1000–1301 ("Secular Archontology of Hungary, 1000–1301"). História, MTA Történettudományi Intézete. Budapest. 

Judges royal
12th-century Hungarian people